United Congregational Church of Irondequoit, also known as Irondequoit United Church of Christ, is a historic Congregational church complex in Rochester in Monroe County, New York. The complex consists of three connected buildings: a Colonial Revival-style church (1926), a Woman's Christian Temperance Union hall (1910), and a church school.

It was listed on the National Register of Historic Places in 2002.

References

External links

Irondequoit United Church of Christ

Churches on the National Register of Historic Places in New York (state)
Churches completed in 1910
Churches in Rochester, New York
National Register of Historic Places in Rochester, New York